Future Force may refer to:
 Future Force (film), a 1989 film starring David Carradine
 Future Force Warrior, a concept for an advanced United States soldier
 Future Force, a 41st-century superhero team led by Rai.